Wansdyke was a county constituency represented in the House of Commons of the Parliament of the United Kingdom. It elected one Member of Parliament (MP) by the first past the post system of election.

The constituency was created for the 1983 general election, and abolished at the 2010 general election.

History 
Until 1997, it was a safe seat for the Conservative Party. It then became a Labour-held marginal until its abolition.

Boundaries 
1983–1997: The District of Wansdyke wards of Bathampton, Batheaston, Bathford, Camerton, Charlcombe, Freshford, Hinton Charterhouse, Keynsham East, Keynsham North, Keynsham South, Keynsham West, Midsomer Norton North, Midsomer Norton Redfield, Newton St Loe, Peasedown St John, Radstock, Saltford, and Westfield, and the District of Kingswood wards of Badminton, Bitton North Common, Bitton Oldland Common, Bitton South, Blackhorse, Bromley Heath, Hanham Abbots East, Hanham Abbots West, Oldland Cadbury Heath, Oldland Longwell Green, Siston, and Springfield.

1997–2010: The District of Wansdyke wards of Cameley, Camerton, Chew Magna, Chew Stoke, Clutton, Compton Dando, Farmborough, Harptrees, High Littleton, Hinton Charterhouse, Keynsham East, Keynsham North, Keynsham South, Keynsham West, Midsomer Norton North, Midsomer Norton Redfield, Newton St Loe, Paulton, Peasedown St John, Publow, Radstock, Saltford, Stowey Sutton, Timsbury, and Westfield, and the Borough of Kingswood wards of Bitton North Common, Bitton Oldland Common, Bitton South, Hanham Abbots East, and Hanham Abbots West.

From 1997, Wansdyke covered the part of Bath and North East Somerset not in the Bath constituency. It also contained six wards or parts of wards from South Gloucestershire Council. It was named after the former Wansdyke district, itself named after the Wansdyke, a historical earthwork.

The constituency was located between the cities of Bristol and Bath, including the towns of Keynsham, Midsomer Norton, Radstock and Saltford, as well as the Chew Valley to the south of Bristol.  It also covered parts of South Gloucestershire to the east of Bristol, including Bitton, Longwell Green and Oldland Common.

At the 2010 general election the seat was replaced with a new North East Somerset constituency.  The parts in South Gloucestershire were transferred to the Kingswood constituency.

Members of Parliament

Elections

Elections in the 2000s

Elections in the 1990s

Elections in the 1980s

See also 
 List of parliamentary constituencies in Avon

References 

Constituencies of the Parliament of the United Kingdom established in 1983
Constituencies of the Parliament of the United Kingdom disestablished in 2010
Parliamentary constituencies in South West England (historic)
Politics of Bath and North East Somerset
Parliamentary constituencies in Somerset (historic)